Vojnik (Montenegrin Cyrillic: Војник) is a mountain range located between the city of Nikšić and towns Šavnik and Plužine in western Montenegro. The name of the mountains means "soldier" in Montenegrin language.

Features

Vojnik mountain range is approximately 17 kilometres long and its maximum width is 8 kilometres. It covers a total area of 138 square kilometres, or approximately 1% of the entire territory of Montenegro, and has 48 peaks higher than 1,500 meters. Vojnik is separated from the surrounding Montenegrin mountains (Maglić, Volujak, Bioč, Durmitor and Morača mountains) by highlands or deep river canyons.

The central part of the mountain is 20 kilometres north of the city of Nikšić and dominates the city's northern horizon.

The geological composition of Vojnik is similar to that of neighbouring mountains, Maganik, Golija and Prekornica. It is predominantly made of limestone, and rich in karstic formations.

Peaks

Vojnik mountain range encompasses a total of 48 peaks higher than 1,500 meters. Five highest peaks of Vojnik are:

 Vojnik 
 Bezimeni vrh 
 Gradni vrh 
 Bezimeni vrh 
 Mramorje

References

Vojnik
Nikšić Municipality
Šavnik Municipality